The Cemetery Bluff District, on Cemetery Rd. in Natchez, Mississippi, is a  historic district that was listed on the National Register of Historic Places in 1980.  It includes a mix of Victorian architectural styles.

The district comprises twenty-five contributing properties: eighteen buildings, five other structures, and two sites.  It consists of the Natchez City Cemetery at the southern end, the Natchez National Cemetery at the northern, and properties along Cemetery Road in between.  Cemetery Road also is known as Maple Street on portions in the county vs. in the Natchez city limits.

See also 
There are several other NRHP-listed historic districts in Natchez:
Woodlawn Historic District (Natchez, Mississippi), a historically black neighborhood historic district (HD)
Holy Family Catholic Church Historic District, another historically black neighborhood HD
Upriver Residential District, adjacent to the Woodlawn HD, on the west
Natchez On-Top-of-the-Hill Historic District, south of Upriver HD
Natchez Bluffs and Under-the-Hill Historic District, on river side of On-Top-of-the-Hill HD
Downriver Residential Historic District, further south below the On-Top-of-the-Hill HD
Clifton Heights Historic District, on the river side of the Upriver HD

References 

Victorian architecture in Mississippi
Cemeteries on the National Register of Historic Places in Mississippi
Historic districts in Natchez, Mississippi
Historic districts on the National Register of Historic Places in Mississippi
National Register of Historic Places in Natchez, Mississippi